Danuta Stenka (born 10 October 1961 in Sierakowice, Poland) is a Polish actress. She is one of the leading Polish film and theatre actresses.

Life and career
From 1991, she spent a decade working at Teatr Dramatyczny in Warsaw, then at TR Warszawa. She earned critical acclaim for her distinguished roles in Krzysztof Warlikowski's performances (Electra, The Taming of the Shrew, Krum, Angels in America and (A)pollonia). In 2003, she joined the ensemble of the National Theatre in Warsaw, taking on roles with many renowned directors, including Robert Wilson (Lady from the Sea), Grzegorz Jarzyna (Giovanni), and Maja Kleczewska (Phaedra, Marat/Sade, Oresteia). She played in many films and TV series and won over 30 awards for her theatre and film work. She received the Silver Medal for Merit to Culture‚ Gloria Artis’, awarded by the Polish Ministry of Culture.

Selected filmography

See also
Polish cinema
Polish Film Awards

External links
 
 :pl:Prowokator (film)

 
 Danuta Stenka at culture.pl

1961 births
Living people
Polish film actresses
Polish stage actresses
Polish voice actresses
Kashubians
Recipients of the Silver Medal for Merit to Culture – Gloria Artis